Thanks for the Memory: The Great American Songbook, Volume IV is the fourth title in Rod Stewart's series of covers of pop standards, released on 18 October 2005 for J Records, and his 23rd album overall.

Track listing

Charts

Weekly charts

Year-end charts

Certifications

References

External links
 http://www.rodstewartfanclub.com/about_rod/disco/album_detail.php?album_id=346

2005 albums
Rod Stewart albums
Albums produced by Clive Davis
J Records albums
Traditional pop albums
Albums recorded at Capitol Studios
Covers albums